Vettangudi Bird Sanctuary is a  protected area, declared in June 1977 near Thirupattur in the Sivaganga District that includes the periya kollukudi patti, chinna kollukudi patti, and vettangudi patti irrigation tanks.

The heaviest rainfall occurs between October and December, when the northeast monsoon brings in 330-390 mm of rainfall.

Fauna
This area of small drainage basins attracts more than 8,000 winter migratory birds belonging to 217 species, mostly from European and North Asian countries. It is a breeding habitat for grey herons, darters, spoonbills, white ibis, Asian openbill stork, and night herons. It has also attracted indigenous endangered species including painted stork, grey heron, darter, little cormorant, little egret, intermediate egret, cattle egret, common teal, Indian spot-billed ducks, pintail, and flamingos.

Notes

Bird sanctuaries of Tamil Nadu
Sivaganga district
1977 establishments in Tamil Nadu
Protected areas established in 1977